Side Walk Slam was an American three-piece punk rock band, that would later form the band Run Kid Run. The band formed in Southern Illinois in a thriving local punk scene. Originally signed to Boot to Head Records.

Discography
...And We Drive, 2003 (Tooth & Nail Records)
Give Back, 2002 (Tooth & Nail Records)
Past Remains, 2001 (Tooth & Nail Records)
2 Steps Forward, 5 Steps Back, 2000 (Boot to Head Records)
Rock Anthems From The Midwest, 1999 (independent)

References

External links
Side Walk Slam | Jesusfreakhideout.com Side Walk Slam band profile on Jesus Freak Hideout

Tooth & Nail Records artists
Christian punk groups
American punk rock groups
Musical groups disestablished in 2003